Astro Duel Deluxe is a shoot 'em up game developed and published by Panic Button and released for the Nintendo Switch in May 2017. The game has an aggregate score of 53 on Metacritic. It is an updated version of Astro Duel, which released for Windows in 2016.

Reception 

Astro Duel Deluxe has a score on review aggregator website Metacritic indicating "mixed or average" reviews.

Writing for Nintendo Life, Matt Forde gave the game a "good" rating of 7/10. While he panned Classic Mode, calling it a "disappointing abyss" where "fighting CPU opponents "can only hold up so long" he praised the "great quality and quantity" of the levels provided, each of which he found brought "different landscapes to maneuver and obstacles to avoid." Forde also praised the soundtrack, which he felt made "every fight exciting and tense". Forde concluded by calling Astro Duel Deluxe's multiplayer "fast-paced" and "frantic", saying that it would "have you yelling and screaming for all the right reasons," but derided its lack of a meaningful single player experience which Forde felt was warranted given the game's "premium" price.

In his more negative review for Nintendo World Report, Justin Nation gave the game a 6.5/10. He praised the "diverse" array of maps and options which he felt "provided variety" and the "simple but well-executed" controls while bemoaning the "short-lived" single player mode and the "sterile exercise" of fighting the CPUs within. Further derision was aimed at the lack of an online multiplayer mode as well as finding other people to play with as Forde felt the game "wasn't for everyone".

References 

Nintendo Switch games
Nintendo Switch-only games
2017 video games
Shoot 'em ups
Video games developed in the United States